James Philbrick "Phil" Gigante (born April 5, 1966) is an American narrator of audiobooks. He has won 11 Earphone Awards and 3 Audie Awards.

In 2015, he pleaded guilty to both accosting a minor for immoral purposes and possessing child sexually abusive material.

Personal life 
Gigante lives in Ludington, Michigan.

Pedophilia 
On July 10, 2015, Gigante was arrested and  charged with accosting a minor for immoral purposes, possession of child sexually abusive material, and two counts of using computers to commit a crime, which could have resulted in 16- to 28-year felony charges.

On October 13, 2015, Gigante pleaded guilty to accosting a minor for immoral purposes and possessing child sexually abusive material. Based on a plea agreement, he was called to serve "to serve four months in jail and three months at home on tether" with further sentencing in December of that year. The latter counts for using computers to commit a crime were dropped.

Awards and honors

References 

1966 births
Living people
21st-century American actors
Actors from Michigan
People from Ludington, Michigan